On 4 July 2002 a Boeing 707-123B operated by Prestige Airlines and owned by New Gomair, crashed during an emergency landing at Bangui Airport. 28 people on board were killed and two survived. The flight was bound to Brazzaville, but the crew decided to divert to Bangui when the landing gear had not retracted.

Background
The international flight was carrying passengers and a load of onions and garlic from Chad to the Central African Republic. There were 17 Chadian passengers on board. The Boeing belonged to a small airline New Gomair, owned by local businessmen, but was chartered by Prestige Airlines at the time of the accident.

Crash
On final approach to Bangui, the aircraft descended until it contacted the ground. The crash occurred in clear weather at about 11:15 a.m. in the Guitangola neighborhood, two miles short of the Bangui Airport's runway. The aircraft exploded upon touchdown, scattering wreckage and reportedly causing the roof of an empty house to collapse.

The two survivors were engineer Laurent Tabako and a woman from Chad, both were admitted to a hospital. According to Tabako, the engines stopped before landing and the crew may have dumped too much fuel before an emergency landing. The witnesses reportedly did not hear the usual engine noise during the crash and saw no flames when the aircraft disintegrated. The aircraft's flight recorder and voice recorder were recovered and an investigation was launched by the government of the Central African Republic.

References

2002 in the Central African Republic
Accidents and incidents involving the Boeing 707
Aviation accidents and incidents in 2002
2002 disasters in Africa
Aviation accidents and incidents in the Central African Republic
History of Bangui
July 2002 events in Africa